John Beckingham (by 1510 – 1566) was an English politician.

He was a Member (MP) of the Parliament of England for Salisbury in March 1553.

References

1566 deaths
English MPs 1553 (Edward VI)
Year of birth uncertain